The 2014–15 season was Olympiacos's 56th consecutive season in the Super League Greece and their 89th year in existence. Olympiacos also participated in the Greek Cup.

Olympiacos won the domestic title for the fifth year in a row.

Olympiacos also participated in UEFA Europa League Knock-out Stage after being eliminated from the UEFA Champions League Group Stage.

On January 6 Olympiacos announced the end of the cooperation with head coach Míchel. Vítor Pereira was hired as the new manager of the team.

Players

Current squad 
As of 31 January 2015

For recent transfers, see List of Greek football transfers summer 2014

Olympiacos U20 squad 

Olympiacos U20 is the youth team of Olympiacos. They participate in the Super League U20 championship and in UEFA Youth League competition. They play their home games at the 3,000-seater Renti Training Centre in Renti, Piraeus.

Loans ending from 2013–14 season

Out on loan

Friendlies

Pre-season Part 1

International Champions Cup

Pre-season Part 2

Competitions

Super League Greece

League table

Results summary

Positions by round

Matches

1. Matchday 6 vs. PAOK, originally meant to be held on 4 October 2014, was postponed until 4 December 2014 via a direct decision of the Deputy Minister of Culture and Sport, Giannis Andrianos in response to the murder of Ethnikos Piraeus fan Kostas Katsoulis in the municipal Nea Alikarnassos Stadium during the Football League 2 match vs. Irodotos.
2. Matchday 11 vs. Skoda Xanthi, originally meant to be held November 23, 2014, was postponed until January 11, 2015 after the Hellenic Football Federation decided not to appoint referees for all domestic league and cup matches in response to a violent attack versus its member Christoforos Zografos.

Greek Football Cup

Second round – Group A

Third round

Quarter-finals

Semi-finals

Final

UEFA Champions League

Group stage

UEFA Europa League

Olympiacos qualified to UEFA Europa League knock-out stage as the 3rd team of Champions League Group A.

Round of 32

Statistics

Goal scorers

Last updated: 3 May 2014

References

External links 
 Official Website of Olympiacos Piraeus 

Olympiacos F.C. seasons
Olympiacos
Olympiacos
Greek football championship-winning seasons